The 1942 New Mexico Lobos football team represented the University of New Mexico in the Border Conference during the 1942 college football season.  In their first season under head coach Willis Barnes, the Lobos compiled a 4–5–2 record (3–4 against Border opponents), finished sixth in the conference, and were outscored by opponents by a total of 134 to 99.

Schedule

References

New Mexico
New Mexico Lobos football seasons
New Mexico Lobos football